Hualania is a monotypic genus of flowering plants belonging to the family Polygalaceae. The only species is Hualania colletioides.

Its native range is Northwestern Argentina.

References

Polygalaceae
Monotypic Fabales genera